Love Me Right may refer to:

 Love Me Right (Angel City album), 2005
 Love Me Right (Exo album), 2015
 "Love Me Right" (song), by Exo, 2015
 "Love Me Right (Oh Sheila)", by Angel City, 1999
 "Love Me Right", a song by Gretta Ray from the 2021 album Begin to Look Around
 "Love Me Right", a song by Lady Gaga from the 2020 album Chromatica